Physalaemus cuvieri is a species of frog in the family Leptodactylidae.
It is found in Argentina, Brazil, Paraguay, and possibly also Bolivia, Guyana, Uruguay, and Venezuela.
Its natural habitats are subtropical or tropical moist lowland forests, moist savanna, subtropical or tropical dry lowland grassland, subtropical or tropical seasonally wet or flooded lowland grassland, intermittent freshwater lakes, intermittent freshwater marshes, arable land, pastureland, plantations, rural gardens, urban areas, heavily degraded former forest, ponds, irrigated land, seasonally flooded agricultural land, and canals and ditches.
It is threatened by habitat loss.

References

cuvieri
Taxonomy articles created by Polbot
Amphibians described in 1826